Rappakal is a 2005 released Malayalam film directed by Kamal. Mammootty, Nayanthara and Sharada appears in lead roles.

Plot
This is a heartfelt story of a male help/valet and his motherly affection to the elderly woman, whom he looks after. It explores the Keralite soul of the family and the seamier aspects of it and finishes it with an evocation of the need to keep intrinsic humane values, in any period of change. Mammootty plays the role of the help who is also a vigilant caretaker of the Tharavad Veedu and is referred as the "Tree of Goodness" which protects the sanctity of the household. Sharada plays the role of the affectionate mother and Nayanthara as the house help.

Cast
 Mammootty as Krishnan
 Nayanthara as Gauri
 Sharada as Saraswathiyamma (Voice dubbed by M Thangamani)
 Balachandra Menon	as Deva Narayanan
 Geethu Mohandas as	Malavika 
 Vijayaraghavan as Janardana 
 Janardhanan as Sankaran Kuttiyar
 Salim Kumar as Govindan
 Suresh Krishna as Sudhi
 Kalasala Babu as Shekharan
 P. Sreekumar as Balagopal
 Thara Kalyan as Urmila
 Unnikrishnan Namboothiri as Valiya Varma
 Balachandran Chullikadu as Mahendra
 Subbalakshmi as Valiya Varma's Wife
 Kozhikode Sarada as Janu Amma
 Narayanankutty as Karavakaran
 Baburaj as Manikantan
Lishoy
Shobha Mohan as Janardhana Varma's wife
Seema G. Nair as Gauri's sister
Dinesh Prabhakar as Rajappan
 Ottapalam Pappan as Palkkaran
 Vishnu Unnikrishnan as Boy with Aanaval
 Resmi Boban	
 Manka Mahesh	
 Lavanya 
 Poornima Anand as Renu
 Ajay jayaprakash as young Krishnan
 Aashiq Abu as photographer

Box office
The film was both commercial and critical success. It ran 100 days in theatres.

Soundtrack 

All songs were composed by Mohan Sithara and lyrics were penned by Kaithapram.

References

External links 
 

2005 films
2000s Malayalam-language films
Films shot in Ottapalam
Films shot at Varikkasseri Mana
Films scored by Mohan Sithara
Films directed by Kamal (director)